Puerto Triunfo is a town and municipality in Antioquia Department, Colombia.  Near this town is located the Hacienda Napoles, which was once owned by Pablo Escobar.

Natural wonders
 Claro river canyon
 La Danta caves

References

Populated places on the Magdalena River
Port cities in Colombia
Municipalities of Antioquia Department